Eugenio d'Ors Rovira (Barcelona, 28 September 1882 – Vilanova i la Geltrú, 25 September 1954) was a Spanish writer, essayist, journalist, philosopher and art critic. He wrote in both Catalan and Spanish, sometimes under the pseudonym of Xènius.

Biography
Born in Barcelona in 1882, Eugenio d'Ors initiated himself in the modernist literary environments. He participated in his younger years, between nineteen and twenty-five years, in this aesthetic. He studied law in Barcelona and received his PhD degree in Madrid. 

He collaborated from 1906 on in  La Veu de Catalunya and was a member of Catalan Noucentisme. He was the secretary of the Institut d'Estudis Catalans in 1911 and director of the Instrucció Pública de la Mancomunitat de Catalunya (Commonwealth of Catalonia) in 1917, but he left in 1920 after Enric Prat de la Riba's death. In 1923 he moved to Madrid where he became a member of the Real Academia Española in 1927. In 1938, during Spanish Civil War he was the General Director on Fine Arts in the Francoist provisional government in Burgos.

He was the father of the noted Spanish jurist, historian and political theorist, Álvaro d'Ors, and the grandfather of Juan d'Ors.

Works

In Catalan
La fi d'Isidre Nonell, 1902 (narració)
Gloses de quaresma, 1911
La ben plantada, 1911
Gualba la de mil veus, 1911
Oceanografia del tedi, 1918
La vall de Josafat, 1918
Gloses de la vaga, 1919

In Spanish
Estudios de arte (1932)
Introducción a la vida angélica. Cartas a una soledad, 1939
Novísimo glosario (1946)
El secreto de la filosofía, 1947
La verdadera historia de Lidia de Cadaqués, 1954

External links 

Eugenio d'Ors (1881-1954)
Eugenio d'Ors: Vida y obra (Universidad de Navarra)

In Catalan:
Eugeni d'Ors (Escriptors en Llengua Catalana)

1881 births
1954 deaths
Writers from Barcelona
Spanish male writers
Falangists
Catalan-language writers
Journalists from Catalonia
Spanish people of the Spanish Civil War (National faction)
Far-right politics in Catalonia